Federico Palacios Martínez (born 9 April 1995) is a German professional footballer who plays as a striker for Viktoria Köln.

Personal life

Martínez is of Spanish descent.

Club career

Youth
Palacios joined the youth ranks of VfL Wolfsburg in 2009. His four and a half years stay culminated in winning the Under 19 Bundesliga in 2013. After a tremendous first half in the 2013–14 Under 19 Bundesliga season, scoring 29 goals in only 14 matches, Palacios attracted the attention of several clubs in Germany.

RB Leipzig
In January 2014, Palacios signed a professional contract with RB Leipzig until summer 2018. Leipzig had to pay a transfer fee of reportedly €600,000. He made his senior debut on 25 January 2014 coming on as a substitute for Denis Thomalla in a 3. Liga match against Wacker Burghausen.

He made his Bundesliga debut for RB Leipzig on 4 February 2017 as an 80th-minute substitute for Dominik Kaiser in an away 0–1 loss to Borussia Dortmund.

Rot-Weiß Erfurt
On 20 January 2015, he was loaned to 3. Liga side Rot-Weiß Erfurt until the end of the 2014–15 season.

1. FC Nürnberg
In January 2018, 1. FC Nürnberg announced the signing of Palacios for an undisclosed fee.

SSV Jahn Regensburg
On 2 September 2019, SSV Jahn Regensburg announced the signing of Palacios on a three-year deal. He was loaned to MSV Duisburg on 20 January 2021 until the end of the 2020–21 season.

Viktoria Köln
After the 2020–21 season, he joined Viktoria Köln.

International career
Palacios played for the Germany U17 national team and Germany U19 national team each two times.

Career statistics

Honours
VfL Wolfsburg U19
 Under 19 Bundesliga: 2013

RB Leipzig
 3. Liga runners-up: 2013–14

References

External links

1995 births
Living people
Footballers from Hanover
German footballers
Germany youth international footballers
RB Leipzig players
FC Rot-Weiß Erfurt players
1. FC Nürnberg players
SSV Jahn Regensburg players
MSV Duisburg players
FC Viktoria Köln players
Bundesliga players
2. Bundesliga players
3. Liga players
Regionalliga players
Association football forwards